Learning English, Lesson One or Learning English, Lesson 1 (other punctuation variations possible) is a cover album by the German punk band Die Toten Hosen. The album includes covers of mostly British bands, which were big influences on the band.

It is the first all-English album for Die Toten Hosen; the first English language studio album was released three years later. It made the band better known outside of German-speaking countries.

The album features many guest stars, including Johnny Thunders, who died after recording "Born to Lose" for Learning English. According to band members, he already wasn't looking very good when he came to record his part.

The album has a central parody theme of an independent language-learning tape, where "Janet and John" are the teachers. Janet and John are heard in short humorous introductions.

Critical reception
Trouser Press wrote that "the excellently performed and impressively reverent Learning English is less a tribute than a precise re-creation." People called the album "more than just a quirky collector’s item ... [it] is the perfect way to look back—or discover—where [punk] all began." Washington City Paper deemed it "a sappy, charming album of class-of-'77 covers."

Track listing
 Learning English • Step One − 0:31
 "Blitzkrieg Bop" − 1:50 (Ramones)
 "Brickfield Nights" − 3:34 (The Boys)
 Step Two − 0:11
 "Just Thirteen" − 2:30 (The Lurkers)
 "If the Kids Are United" − 3:08 (Sham 69)
 "Nasty Nasty" − 2:06 (999)
 Step Three − 0:17
 "Dirty Pictures" − 2:15 (Radio Stars)
 "Baby Baby" − 3:13 (The Vibrators)
 "Gary Gilmore's Eyes" − 2:15 (The Adverts)
 "Born to Lose" − 3:21 (The Heartbreakers)
 How the Rockafellas Went to Hollywood − 0:18
 "Do You Remember" − 3:25 (The Rockafellas)
 "Carnival in Rio (Punk Was)" − 3:08 (Campino, von Holst/Ronald Biggs)
 Step Four − 0:18
 "Right to Work" − 3:03 (Chelsea)
 "Whole Wide World" − 3:19 (Wreckless Eric)
 "Smash It Up" − 2:57 (The Damned)
 "Stranglehold" − 2:11 (UK Subs)
 Step Five − 0:22
 "Love and a Molotov Cocktail" − 2:30 (The Flys)
 "Do Anything You Wanna Do" − 4:27 (Eddie and the Hot Rods)
 Goodbye from Janet & John − 1:01

2007 remastered anniversary edition bonus tracks
<li> "No One Is Innocent" (Steve Jones/Biggs) – 3:03 (from "Carnival in Rio (Punk Was)"; Sex Pistols cover)
<li> "Should I Stay or Should I Go?" (Mick Jones/Joe Strummer) – 2:43 (from "Warum werde ich nicht satt?"; The Clash cover)
<li> "Rockaway Beach" (Colvin, Cummings, Erdelyi, Hyman) – 1:59 (from "Alles wird vorübergehen"; Ramones cover)
<li> "Eddie & Sheena" (Rogers) – 4:24 (Wayne County & the Electric Chairs cover; recorded for Jürgen Krause's birthday, who is a good friend of the band)
<li> "Richmond" (Billingsley, Allen, Griffiths) – 2:39 (from the US version of Learning English Lesson 1; Pin Point cover)
<li> "In Still of the Night" (Frege, Plain) – 4:11 (Learning English Lesson 1 demo)
<li> "Anything but Love" (Frege, Dangerfield) – 3:58 (Learning English Lesson 1 demo)
 "I Met Her at the Jet Grill" (Meurer/Frege, Plain) – 1:56 (Learning English Lesson 1 demo)

Singles
 1991: "Carnival in Rio (Punk Was)"
 1991: "Baby Baby"
 1992: "Whole Wide World"
 1992: "If the Kids Are United

Personnel
Campino - vocals
Andreas von Holst - guitar
Michael Breitkopf - guitar
Andreas Meurer - bass
Wolfgang Rohde - drums

Charts

References 

1991 compilation albums
Die Toten Hosen compilation albums